Bigambal (also Bigambul, Bigumbil, Pikambul, or Pikumbul) is an extinct and unclassified Australian Aboriginal language from the Pama–Nyungan language family. The Bigambul language region includes the landscape within the local government boundaries of the Goondiwindi Regional Council, including the towns of Goondiwindi, Yelarbon and Texas extending north towards Moonie and Millmerran. The AUSTLANG database maintained by the Australian Institute of Aboriginal and Torres Strait Islander Studies states that the Bigambal language was spoken by the Bigambul people, with Gambuwal and Kwiambal (or Gujambal) known dialects. However, it is likely that the Gamilaraay (or Yuwaaliyaay) language was used by those peoples living in southern Bigambul territory.

Classification 
Dixon (2002) groups Bigambal together with the Bundjalung languages while O'Grady, Voegelin and Voegelin classify it as a 'Wiradjuric' language.

Glottolog states that Wafer and Lissarrague (2008) have classed Bigambal and Yugambal together.

Vocabulary 
Some words from the Bigambal language, as spelt and written by Bigambul authors, include:

 Bamburr: kangaroo
 Dhigaraa: bird
 Dhimba: snake
 Dhurrii: land
 Gayker: echidna
 Gillee: sun
 Gool: fish
 Gulli: rain/water
 Koobee: possum
 Noorah: home/camp
 Warril: river
 Weeimba gilee: hello
 Woodyun: grass

References

External links 
 Bibliography of Bigambul people and language resources, at the Australian Institute of Aboriginal and Torres Strait Islander Studies

Unclassified languages of Australia
Extinct languages of Queensland